S&S – Sansei Technologies (formerly S&S Sports, S&S Power, and S&S Worldwide) is an American company known for its pneumatically powered amusement rides and roller coaster designing.

History

Stan Checketts with his wife Sandy (Stan & Sandy) founded S&S Sports, Inc in 1994 in Logan, Utah. S&S Sports manufactured bungee jumping and trampoline equipment. Later that year, S&S began manufacturing air-powered amusement rides which is now the main stay of the company. S&S Sports was sold in 1996.

In 2002, S&S began looking for opportunities to expand their business, citing acquisitions as the best method to do so. Following the bankruptcy filing of wooden roller coaster manufacturer Custom Coasters International (CCI), S&S hired founder Denise Dinn-Larrick and several other former CCI employees to start a new wooden coaster division for the company. In October 2002, S&S founded S&S Arrow, a limited liability company which purchased the assets of the bankrupt Arrow Dynamics. However, the only Arrow Dynamics coaster design S&S continues to offer is the 4th dimension coaster.

In 2004, after four wooden roller coasters were built, S&S closed that division of the company.

In 2006, S&S Power opened Celebration Centre, a Family Entertainment Center featuring a number of S&S rides and prototypes. The facility was later sold and is currently no longer operating.

On August 25, 2006 S&S Power, Inc. announced that Stan Checketts and Gene Mulvihill, both original founding partners of S&S, had formed a group to purchase a controlling interest of S & S. The negotiations took several months. CEO Checketts was to direct the company based on the same principles upon which it was founded; "...to provide the amusement industry with thrilling, high-quality rides the entire family can enjoy." Checketts also announced that the business operations of S&S would remain under the direction of Rich Allen, who would continue in his role as Chief Operating Officer.

In February 2009, Larsen MacColl Partners acquired a significant equity interest in S&S, including all shares previously owned by Checketts. The Koffman family and affiliated shareholders were to maintain their ownership interest. Checketts ended his consulting relationship with the company in order to pursue other business interests. As of December 2013, those interests included Soaring Eagle Zipline Inc., of Logan Utah.

In November 2012, S&S Worldwide Inc., entered into a binding agreement with Sansei Technologies Co., Ltd., of Osaka, Japan, whereby Sansei acquired 77.3% interest in S&S. Signage at the 2012 and 2013 IAAPA Attractions Expos promoted the new company as S&S – Sansei Technologies.

On March 30, 2018, it was announced that Sansei Technologies had acquired amusement ride manufacturer Vekoma.

Stan Checketts, aged 80, died January 2, 2022, at his home in Providence, Utah.

Types of amusement rides

Roller coasters

Towers
 Space Shot
 Turbo Drop
 Double Shot
 Combo Tower Ride
 Multi-Tower (Two to four Turbo Drop, Space Shot, and/or Combo Tower rides in a single complex)
 Rotating Tower
 Spin Shot
 Sky Sling No longer available
 Choose Your Thrill Tower (One tower is small, another is medium-sized, and last tower is the tallest)
 Sonic Boom (Prototype)

Flat rides
 Sky Swatter No longer available
 Screamin' Swing
 Frog Hopper
 Jungle Swing
 Monkey Madness

List of roller coasters

As of 2021, S&S – Sansei Technologies has built 41 roller coasters around the world.

List of other attractions

References

External links
 
 

Amusement ride manufacturers
Roller coaster manufacturers
Manufacturing companies based in Utah
Manufacturing companies established in 1994
 
1994 establishments in Utah
Logan, Utah
American subsidiaries of foreign companies
2012 mergers and acquisitions